Michael John Chaplin (born March 7, 1946) is an American actor born in Santa Monica, California. He is the second child and eldest son from Charlie Chaplin's fourth and final marriage, to Oona O'Neill.

He was first married to the writer Patrice Chaplin, with whom he has two sons. He later married Patricia Betaudier, a painter and the daughter of Trinidian painter Patrick Betaudier. He has five children with her, including actresses Carmen Chaplin and Dolores Chaplin.

In the mid-1960s Chaplin signed a book contract with British publisher Leslie Frewin to publish his autobiography I Couldn't Smoke The Grass On My Father's Lawn, which was ghostwritten with Tom Merrin and Charles Hamblett. This was a teenage hippie-memoir of drugs and rebellion against a world-famous father. Before its release Chaplin filed an injunction to prevent publication, arguing that it would have a detrimental effect on himself and his family. The injunction was set aside by judges for the Court of Appeal, who argued that Chaplin's contract was binding because he stood to gain from the work's publication, as it launched his writing career.

In addition, Chaplin is the author of a novel, The Fallen God, a modern version of the story of Tristan and Iseult.

Filmography
Limelight (1952) as Child in Opening Scene (uncredited)
A King in New York (1957) as Rupert Macabee
Promise Her Anything (1965) as Heathcliff - Beatnik (uncredited)
The Sandwich Man (1966) as Pavement Artist
The Innovators (2014) as the Voice of the Minister (short film)

References

External links

1946 births
Living people
American male film actors
American people of British descent
American people of English descent
American people of Irish descent
Michael
Male actors from Santa Monica, California
20th-century American male actors
American autobiographers
Writers from Santa Monica, California